God Bless the Child is an album by American jazz guitarist Kenny Burrell featuring performances recorded in 1971 and released on the CTI label.

Reception
The Allmusic review states "This is Burrell at his level best as a player to be sure, but also as a composer and as a bandleader. Magnificent".

Track listing
All compositions by Kenny Burrell except where noted
 "Be Yourself" -  5:56 
 "Love Is the Answer" - 4:54 
 "Do What You Gotta Do" - 9:35 
 "A Child Is Born" (Thad Jones) - 8:37
 "God Bless the Child" (Billie Holiday, Arthur Herzog, Jr.) - 8:55
 "Ballad of the Sad Young Men" (Fran Landesman, Tommy Wolf) - 2:19 
 "Lost in the Stars" (Kurt Weill, Maxwell Anderson) - 2:27 
 "A Child Is Born" [alternate take] (Jones) - 7:09
Recorded at Van Gelder Studio in Englewood Cliffs, New Jersey on April 28 (tracks 1, 3, 5 & 8), May 11 (tracks 4 & 7) and May 25 (tracks 2 & 6), 1971

Tracks 6-8 are bonus tracks on CD issues, not on the original LP.

Personnel
Kenny Burrell - electric guitar
Freddie Hubbard - trumpet (except tracks 6 & 7)
Hubert Laws - flute (except tracks 6 & 7)
Richard Wyands - piano, electric piano (except tracks 6 & 7)
Hugh Lawson - electric piano (except tracks 6 & 7)
Ron Carter - bass (except tracks 6 & 7)
Billy Cobham - drums (except tracks 6 & 7)
Ray Barretto, Airto Moreira - percussion (except tracks 6 & 7)
Seymour Barab, Charles McCracken, George Ricci, Lucien Schmit, Alan Shulman - cello (except tracks 6 & 7)
Don Sebesky - arranger, conductor

References

CTI Records albums
Kenny Burrell albums
1971 albums
Albums produced by Creed Taylor
Albums arranged by Don Sebesky
Albums recorded at Van Gelder Studio